Blakea is a genus of flowering plants in the family Melastomataceae. There are about 189 species distributed from Mexico to Bolivia and the Antilles. They are climbers, shrubs, and trees, some epiphytic.

Species, accepted as of March 2021, include:

Blakea acostae 
Blakea acuminata 
Blakea adscendens 
Blakea aeruginosa 
Blakea albertiae 
Blakea allotricha 
Blakea alternifolia 
Blakea amabilis 
Blakea amplifolia 
Blakea andreana 
Blakea anomala 
Blakea arboricola 
Blakea argentea 
Blakea asplundii 
Blakea attenboroughii 
Blakea austin-smithii 
Blakea barbata 
Blakea bocatorena 
Blakea brachyura 
Blakea bracteata 
Blakea brasiliensis 
Blakea brenesii 
Blakea brevibractea 
Blakea brunnea 
Blakea bullata 
Blakea calcarata 
Blakea calophylla 
Blakea calycosa 
Blakea calycularis 
Blakea calyptrata 
Blakea campii 
Blakea castanedae 
Blakea chlorantha 
Blakea ciliata 
Blakea clavata 
Blakea clusiifolia 
Blakea coloradensis 
Blakea cordata 
Blakea costaricensis 
Blakea crassifolia 
Blakea crinita 
Blakea cuatrecasasii 
Blakea cuneata 
Blakea cuprina 
Blakea cutucuensis 
Blakea darcyana 
Blakea dimorphophylla 
Blakea discolor 
Blakea dodsonorum 
Blakea droseropila 
Blakea durandiana 
Blakea echinata 
Blakea elliptica 
Blakea eplingii 
Blakea eriocalyx 
Blakea fasciculata 
Blakea ferruginea 
Blakea fissicalyx 
Blakea florifera 
Blakea foliacea 
Blakea formicaria 
Blakea fragrantissima 
Blakea fuchsioides 
Blakea gerardoana 
Blakea glaberrima 
Blakea glabrescens 
Blakea glandulosa 
Blakea gracilis 
Blakea granatensis 
Blakea grandiflora 
Blakea gregii 
Blakea grisebachii 
Blakea guatemalensis 
Blakea hammelii 
Blakea hammettiorum 
Blakea harlingii 
Blakea henripittieri 
Blakea herrerae 
Blakea hexandra 
Blakea hirsuta 
Blakea hirsutissima 
Blakea hispida 
Blakea holtonii 
Blakea horologica 
Blakea hydraeformis 
Blakea incompta 
Blakea induta 
Blakea inflata 
Blakea insignis 
Blakea intricata 
Blakea involvens 
Blakea jativae 
Blakea killipii 
Blakea laevigata 
Blakea lanuginosa 
Blakea latifolia 
Blakea lentii 
Blakea lindeniana 
Blakea litoralis 
Blakea longibracteata 
Blakea longiloba 
Blakea longipes 
Blakea longisepala 
Blakea macbrydei 
Blakea madisonii 
Blakea maguirei 
Blakea maurofernandeziana 
Blakea mcphersonii 
Blakea megaphylla 
Blakea mexiae 
Blakea micrantha 
Blakea modica 
Blakea monticola 
Blakea mortoniana 
Blakea multiflora 
Blakea muricata 
Blakea nangaritzana 
Blakea nareliana 
Blakea nodosa 
Blakea oldemanii 
Blakea orientalis 
Blakea ovalis 
Blakea paleacea 
Blakea paludosa 
Blakea parasitica 
Blakea parvifolia 
Blakea pascoensis 
Blakea pauciflora 
Blakea pectinata 
Blakea penduliflora 
Blakea perforata 
Blakea pichinchensis 
Blakea pilosa 
Blakea platypoda 
Blakea pluvialis 
Blakea podagrica 
Blakea polyantha 
Blakea portentosa 
Blakea princeps 
Blakea pulverulenta 
Blakea punctulata 
Blakea purpusii 
Blakea pyxidanthus 
Blakea quadrangularis 
Blakea quadriflora 
Blakea repens 
Blakea rosea 
Blakea rostrata 
Blakea rotundifolia 
Blakea sawadae 
Blakea scarlatina 
Blakea schlimii 
Blakea schultzei 
Blakea sessilifolia 
Blakea setosa 
Blakea spruceana 
Blakea squamigera 
Blakea standleyana 
Blakea standleyi 
Blakea stellaris 
Blakea stephanochaeta 
Blakea steyermarkii 
Blakea stipulacea 
Blakea storkii 
Blakea suaveolens 
Blakea subbarbata 
Blakea subconnata 
Blakea subpanduriformis 
Blakea subscabrula 
Blakea subsessiliflora 
Blakea subvaginata 
Blakea superba 
Blakea tapantiana 
Blakea tetramera 
Blakea tetroici 
Blakea toachiensis 
Blakea trianae 
Blakea trinervia 
Blakea truncata 
Blakea tuberculata 
Blakea unguiculata 
Blakea urbaniana 
Blakea vallensis 
Blakea venusta 
Blakea verrucosa 
Blakea villosa 
Blakea watsonii 
Blakea wilburiana 
Blakea wilsoniorum

References

 
Melastomataceae genera
Taxonomy articles created by Polbot